Georgette Anne Sheridan (born 12 June 1952) is a Canadian lawyer and politician from Saskatchewan.

Biography
She was born on 12 June 1952 in Calgary, Alberta. She graduated B.Ed. in 1975, and LL.B. in 1982, both from the University of Saskatchewan. She was admitted to the bar of Saskatchewan in 1983, and practised law.

She was a member of the House of Commons of Canada from 1993 to 1997. She was elected in the Saskatoon—Humboldt electoral district as a Liberal candidate in the 1993 federal election, and sat in the 35th Canadian Parliament. Sheridan retired from politics after losing to Reform candidate Jim Pankiw in the 1997 election.

She was appointed to the Tax Court of Canada on June 19, 2003, and resigned from the bench on May 1, 2015.

References

External links
 

1952 births
Women members of the House of Commons of Canada
Living people
Liberal Party of Canada MPs
Members of the House of Commons of Canada from Saskatchewan
Politicians from Calgary
Women in Saskatchewan politics